is a Japanese photographer.

References
Nihon shashinka jiten / 328 Outstanding Japanese Photographers. Kyoto: Tankōsha, 2000. .  Despite the English-language alternative title, all in Japanese.

Japanese photographers
1935 births
Living people
People from Saitama Prefecture
Date of birth missing (living people)
20th-century Japanese photographers